Salvador María Correa Keen (28 May 1916 in Buenos Aires – 20 June 2002) was an Argentinian bobsledder who competed in the late 1940s. At the 1948 Winter Olympics in St. Moritz, he finished 12th in the four-man event.

References

External links
 
 

1916 births
2002 deaths
Argentine male bobsledders
Olympic bobsledders of Argentina
Bobsledders at the 1948 Winter Olympics
Sportspeople from Buenos Aires